The women's 3000 metres event at the 1983 Pan American Games was held in Caracas, Venezuela on 28 August.

Results

References

Athletics at the 1983 Pan American Games
1983